Taku Harbor (Lingít: S'iknáx̱ Saankʼi) (also spelled Taco, Tacou, or Takou) is a small, remote bay located on the eastern shore of Stephens Passage about  southeast of central Juneau, Alaska, United States.

Taku Harbor is named after the Taku people; this name was applied as early as 1848 by Captain Lieutenant M. N. Vasilief of the Imperial Russian Navy.  It was the site of Fort Durham, a trading post established by the Hudson's Bay Company in 1840; this location is now a National Historic Landmark.

On the eastern shore Taku Harbor is the community of Taku Harbor (alternatively spelled Tako, Takoo, or Takou and formerly known as Takokakaan or the Taku-kon Villages).  This has comprised up to four Tlingit villages or camps.  A census taken in 1880 provided a population count of 269.

The San Juan Fishing & Packing Company established a salmon cannery and cold-storage plant at Taku Harbor in 1901.  It was the only such plant to operate in Alaska until 1909.

See also
 Taku Harbor Seaplane Base
 Taku Harbor State Marine Park

References

External links
 Tides and Currents for Taku Harbor

Geography of Juneau, Alaska
Populated coastal places in Alaska on the Pacific Ocean
Populated places in Juneau, Alaska
Ports and harbors of Alaska
Road-inaccessible communities of Alaska